Panagiotis Mantis (born 30 September 1981) is a Greek competitive sailor.

He competed at the 2016 Summer Olympics in Rio de Janeiro in the men's 470, along with Pavlos Kagialis, winning the bronze medal.

Mantis and Kagialis also won the bronze medal at the 470 World Championships in 2013, while they took another time the third place at the 2014 World Championships in Santander. They were second at the 2013 Mediterranean Games in Mersin.

At the 2020 Summer Olympics, in Tokyo, he participated along with Kagialis and took the eighth place.

References

External links

1981 births
Living people
Greek male sailors (sport)
Olympic sailors of Greece
Sailors at the 2016 Summer Olympics – 470
Olympic bronze medalists for Greece
Olympic medalists in sailing
Medalists at the 2016 Summer Olympics
Mediterranean Games silver medalists for Greece
Competitors at the 2013 Mediterranean Games
Mediterranean Games medalists in sailing
World champions in sailing for Greece
Platu 25 class world champions
Sailors at the 2020 Summer Olympics – 470
Sailors (sport) from Athens